Prigen ( or called "Tretes") is a district in the Pasuruan Regency of East Java, Indonesia. Prigen is located on the slope of the Arjuno volcano. Taman Safari II is located in Prigen.

The 13th century Candi Jawi (originally known as Jajawa) temple is located on the eastern slope of Mount Welirang outside Candi Wates village in the Prigen district. It is a syncretic Hindu-Buddhist  temple (candi)

References

Pasuruan Regency
Districts of East Java